The Kiss or The Kiss of Death (Italian: Il bacio) is a 1974 Italian historical drama film directed by Mario Lanfranchi and starring Maurizio Bonuglia, Eleonora Giorgi and Martine Beswick.

The film's sets were designed by the art director Giancarlo Bartolini Salimbeni. It was shot at the Elios Film Studios in Rome and on location in Venice.

Cast

References

Bibliography 
 Curti, Roberto. Italian Gothic Horror Films, 1970-1979. McFarland, 2017.

External links

 

1974 films
Italian historical drama films
1970s historical drama films
1970s Italian-language films
Films directed by Mario Lanfranchi
1974 drama films
1970s Italian films